Chitra Visweswaran is an Indian Bharata Natyam dancer who runs a dance school, the Chidambaram Academy of Performing Arts, in Chennai.

She was awarded the Padma Shri, one of the top civilian honours given by the Government of India, in 1992.

Early life and training 
Visweswaran began dancing at the age of three with her mother, Rukmini Padmanabhan, who was trained in contemporary Indian dance and Bharata Natyam. Her father was an engineer with Indian Railways, and when his job took the family to London, Chitra began to study classical ballet. Later, in Kolkata, she trained in the Manipuri and Kathak dance forms. At the age of ten, she went under the tutelage of T.A. Rajalakshmi, one of the best devadasis from Thiruvidaimarudur, who had settled in Kolkata. Her arangetram—her debut onstage performance—took place within ten months, an unusually short period, and she continued to train with Rajalakshmi for almost a decade.

At thirteen, Visweswaran choreographed the life of Saint Tyagaraja in the form of a varnam, the most demanding type of piece in the Bharata Natyam repertoire. She wanted to move to Chennai (then called Madras) after finishing school to pursue a career in dance, but her parents insisted that she complete a college degree. She earned a BA in English from the University of Calcutta while simultaneously studying dance theory and the history of dance on her own time.

In 1970, she received a scholarship for advanced study in Bharata Natyam from the Indian Ministry of Human Resource Development at a time when only two such scholarships per year were awarded nationwide, compared with 25 today. She spent her four-year scholarship period studying in Chennai under Vazhuvoor Ramaiyya Pillai. Within three months, he chose Visweswaran over his other students to star in a dance drama he had choreographed. The musicologist P. Sambamurthy, the art historian Kapila Vatsyayan, and the dance critic Sunil Kothari all noted her work. Visweswaran is also well-versed in Rabindranritya, Rabindrasangeet, and Theater.

Teaching work 
Visweswaran started teaching dance in Kolkata at the age of sixteen, and in 1975, she established the Chidambaram Academy of Performing Arts (CAPA) in Chennai. Today, CAPA has satellite institutions around the world led by former students. Admission is highly selective, and graduates have received national and international scholarships and fellowships.

Visweswaran also raises money for RASA, an organisation that uses dance and music therapy for children with learning disabilities.

Dance productions 
In 1980, Visweswaran choreographed her first major dance drama, Devi Ashta Rasa Malika, which helped popularise the concept of group formations in Bharata Natyam. Several thematic solo productions followed, including:
 Krishnanjali, which introduced the flashback technique to Bharata Natyam
 Purandara Krishnamritham, in which rare kritis of the Kannada composer Purandara Dasa were researched and strung together thematically
 Saptha Sapthi, which explored seven aspects of the number seven
 Sthree Sakthi, a saga of Indian women from Sita to Jhansi Ki Rani
One of her group productions explored the parallels between two women's approaches to poetry and bhakti: the South Indian saint Andal and the Mewari princess Meera. In another work, a production of the Ramayana, Visweswaran used a single Sanskrit kriti, translated into Tamil, to anchor the dance musically. She also produced Devaki Pulambal from the viewpoint of Devaki, the mother of Krishna, instead of the viewpoint of the story's traditional narrator, Yasodharā.

Visweswaran eventually dropped costumes from her productions, arguing that playing a character solely through mime, gesture, and stance was more challenging than playing a character in the expected costume.

In 1989, India's National Academy of Sciences commissioned her to create a production about the Ganges river, not highlighting its religious connotations, but presenting it as representative of the ethos of India.

Performances 
Visweswaran has performed in all of India's major dance festivals and has made several tours abroad, dancing in Australia, Austria, Bahrain, Belgium, Bulgaria, Canada, Fiji, France, Germany, Italy, Kuwait, Luxembourg, Malaysia, the Netherlands, Oman, Portugal, Qatar, Singapore, Sri Lanka, Sweden, Switzerland, the United Arab Emirates, the United Kingdom, and the United States.

She is regularly featured on the National Program of Dance and on local programs of Doordarshan and other Indian channels. Her dances have also been broadcast by The Mike Walsh Show in Australia, the Singapore Broadcasting Corporation, BBC Television, and networks in France, Malaysia, Portugal, Switzerland, and the United States. On the 50th anniversary of India's independence, the BBC invited her to present a specially choreographed program at Symphony Hall in Birmingham that was telecast internationally on 15 August 1997.

Awards and distinctions 
In 1980, Sri Krishna Gana Sabha, an Indian cultural institution, gave Visweswaran its Nritya Choodamani award. In 1996 and 1997, she convened the Sabha's Natya Kala conference, the only dance seminar of its kind in India. She is a trustee of the India Foundation for the Arts and a member of the Indian government committee that selects candidates for scholarships and fellowships in Bharata Natyam. She is the University of Madras's Rabindranath Tagore Chair in Fine Arts, and is also a member of the general council and executive board of the Sangeet Natak Akademi, the top performing arts body in India.

The government of Tamil Nadu conferred the title "Kalaimamani" on her in 1982. She received the Sangeet Natak Akademi Award in 1987 and the Padma Shri from the President of India in 1992. In addition, in India's 50th year of independence, she was awarded the titles of Mahila Shiromani (distinguished woman of Indian origin) and Sthree Ratna (gem amongst women). The Japan Foundation invited her to be its special guest in 2000. In 2013, she was the recipient of the Music Academy's Natya Kala Acharya Award for Dance. She has also presented her work at United Nations, UNESCO.

Other honours include: 
 Nritya Vilas award, Sur Singar Samsad, Mumbai, 1988
 Manav Sewa Puraskar, Institute of Economic Studies, New Delhi, 1992
 Natanamani, Kanchi Paramacharya, 1999

Personal life 
Visweswaran's husband, Sri R. Visweswaran, a nephew of the Carnatic musician G.N. Balasubramaniam, was a vocalist, instrumentalist, and composer with extensive experience in film music. He played the santoor, veena, and flamenco guitar, and had composed and directed music for his wife's productions.

References

External links

Legends of dance
Chitra Visweswar bio
Chitra Visweswar website
Chitra Visweswaran Interview
Chitra Visweswaran award
From THE HINDU papers

Recipients of the Padma Shri in arts
Performers of Indian classical dance
Artists from Chennai
Living people
Year of birth missing (living people)
University of Calcutta alumni
Bharatanatyam exponents
20th-century Indian dancers
Women artists from Tamil Nadu
Indian female classical dancers
Dancers from Tamil Nadu
20th-century Indian women artists
Recipients of the Sangeet Natak Akademi Award